Capton is a village near Dartmouth in Devon, England.

References

Villages in Devon
Hill forts in Devon